Acleris roxana is a species of moth of the family Tortricidae. It is found in Japan (Honshu).

The length of the forewings is about 6.5 mm for males and about 7.5 mm for females. The ground colour of the forewings is creamy, sprinkled with greyish yellow in the basal area. The remainder of the wing is ochreous and the costa is spotted and darkened with grey near the base. The hindwings are greyish brown.

References

Moths described in 1964
roxana
Moths of Japan